The Blue River is a tributary of the Colorado River, approximately  long, in the U.S. state of Colorado.

It rises in southern Summit County, on the western side of the continental divide in the Ten Mile Range, near Quandary Peak. It flows northwards past Blue River and Breckenridge, then through the Dillon Reservoir near Dillon. The west portal for the "Roberts Tunnel" is at the base of Dillon Reservoir. The Roberts Tunnel is a trans-basin diversion, built by Denver Water in 1962, that diverts water under the Continental Divide from the Colorado River basin into the South Platte River Basin. The east portal is approximately one mile upstream of Grant, Colorado.

North of Dillon, the river flows north-northwest along the eastern slope of the Gore Range and joins the Colorado River at Kremmling.

The dam is a project of the United States Bureau of Reclamation.

See also
List of rivers of Colorado
List of tributaries of the Colorado River

References

External links 
  of the town of Blue River

Rivers of Colorado
Rivers of Summit County, Colorado
Tributaries of the Colorado River in Colorado